Shi Jingnan (Chinese: 石竟男; born 7 April 1994) is a Chinese male short track speed skater.

References

External links
Shi Jingnan's profile, from http://www.sochi2014.com; retrieved 2014-02-10.

1994 births
Living people
Chinese male short track speed skaters
Olympic short track speed skaters of China
Olympic bronze medalists for China
Olympic medalists in short track speed skating
Short track speed skaters at the 2014 Winter Olympics
Medalists at the 2014 Winter Olympics
Asian Games medalists in short track speed skating
Asian Games gold medalists for China
Short track speed skaters at the 2017 Asian Winter Games
Medalists at the 2017 Asian Winter Games
Universiade medalists in short track speed skating
World Short Track Speed Skating Championships medalists
Universiade bronze medalists for China
Competitors at the 2013 Winter Universiade
21st-century Chinese people